Alois Mitschek (14 March 1889 – 3 April 1974) was an Austrian painter. His work was part of the painting event in the art competition at the 1948 Summer Olympics.

References

1889 births
1974 deaths
20th-century Austrian painters
Austrian male painters
Olympic competitors in art competitions
Artists from Vienna
20th-century Austrian male artists